Ananthavaram or Ananthawaram may refer to several places in India:

 Ananthavaram, Kollur mandal, Guntur district, Andhra Pradesh
 Ananthavaram, Thullur mandal, a neighbourhood of Amaravati, Andhra Pradesh
 Ananthawaram, Ranga Reddy district, Telangana

See also
 Anantharam (disambiguation)